Matz Skoog (born 1957) is a Swedish dancer and director, and the artistic director of English National Ballet from 2001 to 2005.

Skoog was born in Stockholm on 10 April 1957. He trained with the Royal Swedish Ballet School.

References

1957 births
Swedish male ballet dancers
English National Ballet
Living people
People from Stockholm